Jezierce may refer to the following places:
Jezierce, Lubusz Voivodeship (west Poland)
Jezierce, Pomeranian Voivodeship (north Poland)
Jezierce, Warmian-Masurian Voivodeship (north Poland)